KVNF (90.9 FM), is a National Public Radio-affiliated community radio station in Paonia, Colorado. It features locally hosted music programming, independently produced public radio programs, local news and interviews, as well as National Public Radio programming.  KVNF serves Western Colorado via two stations with full-power licenses (KVNF 90.9 FM and KVMT 89.1 FM) and five translators.  All transmitters carry the same programming and are needed to cover KVNF's large and mountainous listening area.

See also
List of community radio stations in the United States

External links
 KVNF official website

KVNF
Community radio stations in the United States
VNF